Kazakhstan competed at the 2022 World Games held in Birmingham, United States from 7 to 17 July 2022. Athletes representing Kazakhstan won one gold medal, two silver medals and one bronze medal. The country finished in 37th place in the medal table.

Medalists

Competitors
The following is the list of number of competitors in the Games.

Acrobatic gymnastics

Kazakhstan won one bronze medal in acrobatic gymnastics.

Archery

Kazakhstan competed in archery.

Dancesport

Kazakhstan competed in dancesport (breaking).

Ju-jitsu

Kazakhstan won one silver medal in ju-jitsu.

Karate

Kazakhstan won one gold medal in karate.

Men

Women

Kickboxing

Kazakhstan competed in kickboxing.

Muaythai

Kazakhstan won one silver medal in muaythai.

Sport climbing

Kazakhstan competed in sport climbing.

References

Nations at the 2022 World Games
2022
World Games